Harry Potter (born 15 December 1997) is a rugby union player for Leicester Tigers in Premiership Rugby, the top division of English rugby union. Potter plays on the wing and centre positions. Potter is eligible to represent both Australia and England at senior international level.  He was a Premiership Rugby champion in 2022.

Early life
Potter was born in Wimbledon in the South London borough of Merton, England. Potter moved to Bristol in his youth before moving again, this time abroad to Melbourne, Victoria, Australia when he was 10-years-old. He played for Brighton Grammar School in his youth career.

Rugby career

Rebels
In August 2019, Potter was announced to have been included in the full Melbourne Rebels squad for the 2020 season after playing with the Melbourne Rising in the National Rugby Championship.

Leicester Tigers
Potter signed for Premiership Rugby side Leicester Tigers ahead of the 2020–21 season. He made his debut on 22 August 2020 against Bath at Welford Road. He started the 2022 Premiership Rugby final as Tigers beat Saracens 15-12.

Reference list

External links
Profile at Rugby.com.au
Profile at Melbourne Rebels

1997 births
Living people
People educated at Brighton Grammar School
Australian rugby union players
English rugby union players
Rugby union players from Wimbledon
Melbourne Rebels players
Rugby union centres
Rugby union wings
Australian people of English descent
Australian expatriate sportspeople in England
Leicester Tigers players
Melbourne Rising players
New South Wales Country Eagles players